Inland Township is one of seventeen townships in Cedar County, Iowa, USA.  As of the 2000 census, its population was 773.

Geography
According to the USGS, it contains two cemeteries: Inland and Moneka.

References

External links
 US-Counties.com
 City-Data.com

Townships in Cedar County, Iowa
Townships in Iowa